The men's 4 × 100 metres relay competition at the 2002 Asian Games in Busan, South Korea was held on 10 and 13 October at the Busan Asiad Main Stadium.

Schedule
All times are Korea Standard Time (UTC+09:00)

Records

Results 
Legend
DNF — Did not finish

1st round 
 Qualification: First 3 in each heat (Q) and the next 2 fastest (q) advance to the final.

Heat 1

Heat 2

Final

References

External links 
Results

Athletics at the 2002 Asian Games
2002